The Democratic Patriotic Alliance of Kurdistan (DPAK) sometimes referred to simply as the Kurdistan Alliance (KA) is the name of the electoral coalition first presented as a united Kurdish list in the January 2005 election in Iraq. Elections were held simultaneously for the assembly of Kurdistan Region. The Alliance represents a coalition of the two main Kurdish parties, the Kurdistan Democratic Party and the Patriotic Union of Kurdistan
 Kurdistan Democratic Party
 Patriotic Union of Kurdistan
 Kurdistan Islamic Union
 Kurdistan Communist Party
 Kurdistan Toilers' Party
 Kurdistan Democratic Socialist Party
 Kurdistan Democratic National Party
The alliance received 1,570,665 votes to the Kurdistan National Assembly, or 90% of the vote. At the federal level, the DPAK took close to 26% of the vote and won 75 seats out of 275 in the Iraqi National Assembly. They were able to secure the selection of Jalal Talabani (the PUK leader) as President of Iraq, while Massoud Barzani (KDP leader) became President of Kurdistan Region.

References

Kurdish nationalism in Iraq
Kurdish political party alliances
Kurdish political parties in Iraq
Kurdish nationalist political parties
Political parties in Kurdistan Region
Defunct political party alliances in Iraq
2005 establishments in Iraqi Kurdistan